Paku Alam IV was Duke (Adipati) of Pakualaman between 1864 and 1878.
Pakualaman (also written Paku Alaman) became a small hereditary Duchy within the Sultanate of Yogyakarta, as a mirror-image of Mangkunegaran in the territory of the Susuhunanate of Surakarta

The son of Paku Alam III, Paku Alam IV was the last Paku Alam to be buried at Kota Gede, his son Paku Alam V was the instigator of the royal burial ground at Girigondo

Subsequent list of rulers
 Paku Alam V, 1878 – 1900
 Paku Alam VI, 1901 – 1902
 Paku Alam VII, 1903 – 1938
 Paku Alam VIII, 1938 – 1999
 Paku Alam IX, 1999 — 2015

Family history

Notes

1878 deaths
Dukes of Pakualaman
Pakualaman
Burials at Kotagede
Indonesian royalty